This is a list of Latvian football transfers in the 2016 summer transfer window by club. Only transfers of the Virslīga are included.

All transfers mentioned are shown in the references at the bottom of the page. If you wish to insert a transfer that isn't mentioned there, please add a reference.

Latvian Higher League

Liepāja 

In:

 

 

Out:

Ventspils 

In:

   
 
 

Out:

Jelgava 

In:

 

  

Out:

Spartaks 

In:

 

   

Out:

Daugavpils 

In:

 

 

 
 

 

  

Out:

METTA/LU 

In:

   

Out:

Riga FC 

In:

 

  
 

 

  

  

Out:

Rīgas Futbola skola 

In:

  

  

  

  

 

Out:

References

External links 
 sportacentrs.com 

2016
Latvia
Football
tansfers